Alnusiin is an ellagitannin found in Alnus sieboldiana.

The molecules of gallic acid, luteic acid and hexahydroxydiphenic acid are present in the structure of alnusiin, bound to a glucose residue.

References 

Ellagitannins